Sweden  competed at the World Games 2017 in Wroclaw, Poland, from July 20, 2017 to July 30, 2017.

Competitors

Archery

Field archery
Sweden has qualified at the 2017 World Games:

 Men's Barebow – 2 quotas (Erik Jonsson, Martin Ottosson)
 Women's Barebow – 1 quota (Lina Bjorklund)
 Men's Recurve – 1 quota (Jonathan Andersson)
 Women's Recurve – 1 quota (Elin Kattstrom)

Gymnastic

Trampoline
Sweden has qualified at the 2017 World Games:

Women's Individual Double Mini Trampoline - 1 quota

Muaythai
Sweden has qualified at the 2017 World Games:

Women's -54 kg -  (Sofia Olofsson)
Women's -57 kg -  (Patricia Axling)
Women's -67 kg -  (Beata Malecki)
Women's -71 kg - (Anna Strandberg)

Orienteering 
 Sprint
 Middle distance
 Sprint relay

References 

Nations at the 2017 World Games
2017 in Swedish sport
2017